James Johnson Duderstadt was the President of the University of Michigan from 1988 to 1996.

Duderstadt was elected a member of the National Academy of Engineering in 1987 for significant contributions to nuclear science and engineering relating to fission and fusion energy systems and reactor theory and design.

On April 30, 2015, the National Science Board announced that James Duderstadt will receive its prestigious Vannevar Bush Award. Duderstadt was being recognized for his leadership in science and technology and his substantial contributions to the welfare of the nation through public service activities in science, technology and public policy.

He currently holds the title of President Emeritus and University Professor of Science and Engineering at the University of Michigan.

Biography
James Johnson Duderstadt was born on 5 December 1942 in Carrollton, Missouri. He received a B.A. from Yale University in 1964, and an M.S. in 1965 and a PhD in 1967 from California Institute of Technology. At Caltech, he studied under nuclear physicist Noel Corngold.

In 1972, he worked for the NASA Lewis Research Center, then for the U.S. Army Missile Command from 1973 to 1975, and eventually for the Argonne National Laboratory from 1975 to 1979.

He worked as an assistant professor of nuclear engineering at the University of Michigan from 1969 to 1972, associate professor from 1972 to 1976, and full professor from 1976 to 1981. He then became dean of the College of Engineering. In 1988, he was appointed as President of the same institution, up until 1996. He and his wife, Anne Lock-Duderstadt, lived in the University's President's House at 815 South University. Their children attended Gay-Jay Montessori Preschool, Lawton Elementary School, Slauson Middle School, and Pioneer High School.

He has served on the boards of National Science Foundation, the National Commission on the Future of Higher Education, the Nuclear Energy Research Advisory Committee of the Department of Energy, the Big Ten Athletic Conference, the University of Michigan Hospitals, Unisys, CMS Energy, the Glion Colloquium, the Journal of Science Policy & Governance, the Intelligence Science Board, etc.

The main library on the University of Michigan's North Campus is named The James and Anne Duderstadt Center (commonly referred as "The Dude") in honor of Duderstadt and his wife, Anne ("Ma Dude"). Formerly called the Media Union, it houses the Art, Architecture & Engineering Library and also contains computer clusters, audio and video editing laboratories, galleries, and studios, as well as usability and various digital media laboratories, including virtual reality. The Millennium Project, which focuses on the future of the university learning environment and is where Duderstadt currently maintains an appointment, is also housed in the Duderstadt Center.

Bibliography
Nuclear Reactor Analysis, 1976 (with Louis J. Hamilton)
Transport Theory, 1979 (with William R. Martin)
Inertial Confinement Fusion, 1982 (with Gregory A. Moses)
Solutions Manual to Principles of Engineering, 1990
A University for the 21st Century, 2000
Higher Education in the Digital Age: Technology Issues and Strategies for American Colleges and Universities, 2002
Intercollegiate Athletics and the American University: A University President's Perspective, 2003
The Future of the Public University in America: Beyond the Crossroads, 2004
The View from the Helm: Leading the American University during an Era of Change, 2007

References

External links
Official webpage
Millennium Project

People from Fort Madison, Iowa
1942 births
Living people
Yale University alumni
California Institute of Technology alumni
Presidents of the University of Michigan
University of Michigan faculty
Gerald R. Ford School of Public Policy faculty
Members of the United States National Academy of Engineering
People from Carrollton, Missouri